Hemeroplanis habitalis, the black-dotted hemeroplanis, is a moth in the family Erebidae. The moth was erected by Francis Walker in 1859.

The MONA or Hodges number for Hemeroplanis habitalis is 8471.

References

Further reading

External links

 

Boletobiinae
Articles created by Qbugbot
Moths described in 1859